The Jämtland Campaigns of 1808–1809 were two Dano-Norwegian military campaigns into the Swedish province of Jämtland during the Dano-Swedish War of 1808-1809.

Campaign of 1808
In mid-August, Major Coldevin began his invasion of Jämtland with 644 men, consisting of musketeers, dragoons, skiers and artillerymen. Coldevin's campaign would however soon encounter difficulties when parts of the army began to rebel. Coldevin managed however to prevent the rebellion by using threats, and since he still had the dragoons on his side the force continued their march into Jämtland. At the same time as Coldevin, Colonel Carsten Gerhard Bang also marched from Røros and into Härjedalen with about 550 men, but Colonel Bang's force did not take part in any battle during the campaign.

After many efforts Coldevin reached Dove entrenchment on 13 August. The entrenchment had recently been built, but had not been equipped with cannons as well as no troops had been stations where, but Swedish scouts in the area still reported that 2,100 Norwegian troops were moving into Jämtland. Dove entrenchment was destroyed by the Norwegians before they continued their march, and reached Hjerpe entrenchment at Järpen on 15 August. Hjerpe entrenchment was located across a wide strait and was defended by two Swedish companies.

On 16 August, the Norwegians attacked the entrenchment, and the unsuccessful assault lasted from about three o'clock in the afternoon until darkness fell. After the about six-hour-long battle the Swedes had six men wounded, of which one later died. The Norwegians had one killed while five were wounded (two severely). On the following day, on 17 August, Coldevin began the march back to Norway after the Swedish troops at Hjerpe entrenchment had received reinforcements. Colonel Bang was awarded the Knight's Cross of the Order of the Dannebrog for his efforts during the campaign.

Campaign of 1809
Christian August was very reluctant in the spring and summer of 1809 to make any Norwegian attack against Sweden, but he was eventually pushed to it by King Frederik VI. On 2 July Christian August ordered an attack against Jämtland from Trondheim, and on 10 July a force of 1,800 men, under the leadership of Major General Georg Frederik von Krogh, marched across the border to Jämtland.

To stop the Norwegian advance, Georg Carl von Döbeln was sent out with a battalion of the Hälsinge Regiment to Jemtland, at the same time an additional battalion from Gävle was sent off against Härjedalen and reinforcements later arrived from the Life Grenadier Regiment and the Kalmar Regiment. However, on 16 July the advancing Norwegian army captured the Hjärpe entrenchment which just had been abandoned by a Swedish force of 200 men under Colonel Theodore Nordenadler. Soon afterwards the Norwegians also captured the villages of Mörsil and Mattmar. But when a rumor that Sweden and Russia had started peace negotiations reached the Norwegian army, von Krogh chose to retreat and instead direct his attack against Härjedalen. On 24 July the Swedish force of 900 men under von Döbeln and the 1,800 Norwegian soldiers met at Härjedalen, the Norwegians force was defeated and had to retreat. An armistice was written the following day at Bleckåsen in Alsens. One condition was that all the Norwegian troops would leave Sweden by 3 August, which also happened.

References

Sources

Campaigns of the Napoleonic Wars
August 1808 events
July 1809 events
Conflicts in 1808
Conflicts in 1809
1808 in Sweden
1809 in Sweden
Dano-Swedish War of 1808–09
History of Jämtland